Bains-les-Bains is a former commune in the Vosges department in Grand Est in eastern France. On 1 January 2017, it was merged into the new commune La Vôge-les-Bains. It was the administrative seat of the former Canton of Bains-les-Bains.

Geography
The river Côney formed the commune's western border.

Points of interest
 Arboretum de Bains-les-Bains
 Canal de l'Est

See also
Communes of the Vosges department

References

External links

 Office de tourisme
 Commune website

Former communes of Vosges (department)